Dommitzsch is a town in the district Nordsachsen, in Saxony, Germany and is Saxony's northmost city. It lies on the left bank of the Elbe, 12 km northwest of Torgau and 31 km southeast of Wittenberg.

References 

Nordsachsen